Anton Martinson (1883 Uulu Parish, Pärnu County – 17 June 1919) was an Estonian politician. He was a member of Estonian Constituent Assembly. On about 18 June 1919, he resigned his position and he was replaced by Märt Raud.

References

1883 births
1919 deaths
Members of the Estonian Constituent Assembly